The meat industry are the people and companies engaged in modern industrialized livestock agriculture for the production, packing, preservation and marketing of meat (in contrast to dairy products, wool, etc.).  In economics, the meat industry is a fusion of primary (agriculture) and secondary (industry) activity and hard to characterize strictly in terms of either one alone. The greater part of the meat industry is the meat packing industry – the segment that handles the slaughtering, processing, packaging, and distribution of animals such as poultry, cattle, pigs, sheep and other livestock.

A great portion of the ever-growing meat branch in the food industry involves intensive animal farming in which livestock are kept almost entirely indoors or in restricted outdoor settings like pens. Many aspects of the raising of animals for meat have become industrialized, even many practices more associated with smaller family farms, e.g. gourmet foods such as foie gras. The production of livestock is a heavily vertically integrated industry where the majority of supply chain stages are integrated and owned by one company.

Efficiency considerations
The livestock industry not only uses more land than any other human activity, but it's also one of the largest contributors to water pollution and a huge source of greenhouse gas emissions. In this respect, a relevant factor is the produced species' feed conversion efficiency. Additionally taking into account other factors like use of energy, pesticides, land, and nonrenewable resources, beef, lamb, goat, and bison as resources of red meat show the worst efficiency; poultry and eggs come out best.

Meat sources

Global production of meat products

Companies
Among the largest meat producers worldwide are:
 JBS S.A.
 Tyson Foods
 WH Group

World beef production

Criticism

Critical aspects of the effects of industrial meat production include
 hormone treatment such as steroids and the effect of consuming meat raised with these on human consumers, (see also Beef hormone controversy)
 animal diseases, e.g. mad-cow disease (BSE), avian flu, swine influenza (H1N1), avian influenza (H5N1), foot-and-mouth disease, some of which can spread to human consumers
 cruelty to animals is a common practice in the meat industry
 certain animal rights advocates and groups believe the production of meat is unethical and the industry should be abolished
 obesity - partially due to overconsumption of meat products
 human disease associated with animal waste, e.g. through E. coli
 cost of state services associated with the above, including meat inspection and health care
 human disease associated with workers in meat and poultry processing facilities
 overall ecological footprint of the meat industry, including the raising of feed and animal waste disposal
 heavy use of groundwater for feeding animals
 deforestation, extinction and other species loss especially in the Amazon region or other places where beef cattle are raised in what was formerly rainforested land
 climate change via greenhouse gases generated by the meat industry is significantly greater than growing and processing fruits and vegetables. The largest agricultural methane source on the planet is livestock. Global greenhouse gas emissions from animal-based foods are twice those of plant-based foods.

Many observers suggest that the expense of dealing with the above is grossly underestimated at present economic metrics and that true/full cost accounting would drastically raise the price of industrial meat.

Effects on livestock workers 
American slaughterhouse workers are three times more likely to suffer serious injury than the average American worker. NPR reports that pig and cattle slaughterhouse workers are nearly seven times more likely to suffer repetitive strain injuries than average. The Guardian reports that, on average, there are two amputations a week involving slaughterhouse workers in the United States. On average, one employee of Tyson Foods, the largest meat producer in America, is injured and amputates a finger or limb per month. The Bureau of Investigative Journalism reported that over a period of six years, in the UK 78 slaughter workers lost fingers, parts of fingers or limbs, more than 800 workers had serious injuries, and at least 4,500 had to take more than three days off after accidents. In a 2018 study in the Italian Journal of Food Safety, slaughterhouse workers are instructed to wear ear protectors to protect their hearing from the constant screams of animals being killed. A 2004 study in the Journal of Occupational and Environmental Medicine found that "excess risks were observed for mortality from all causes, all cancers, and lung cancer" in workers employed in the New Zealand meat processing industry.

The act of slaughtering animals, or of raising or transporting animals for slaughter, may engender psychological stress or trauma in the people involved. A 2016 study in Organization indicates, "Regression analyses of data from 10,605 Danish workers across 44 occupations suggest that slaughterhouse workers consistently experience lower physical and psychological well-being along with increased incidences of negative coping behavior." In her thesis submitted to and approved by University of Colorado, Anna Dorovskikh states that slaughterhouse workers are "at risk of Perpetration-Inducted Traumatic Stress, which is a form of post-traumatic stress disorder and results from situations where the concerning subject suffering from PTSD was a causal participant in creating the traumatic situation." A 2009 study by criminologist Amy Fitzgerald indicates, "slaughterhouse employment increases total arrest rates, arrests for violent crimes, arrests for rape, and arrests for other sex offenses in comparison with other industries." As authors from the PTSD Journal explain, "These employees are hired to kill animals, such as pigs and cows, that are largely gentle creatures. Carrying out this action requires workers to disconnect from what they are doing and from the creature standing before them. This emotional dissonance can lead to consequences such as domestic violence, social withdrawal, anxiety, drug and alcohol abuse, and PTSD."

Slaughterhouses in the United States commonly illegally employ and exploit underage workers and illegal immigrants. In 2010, Human Rights Watch described slaughterhouse line work in the United States as a human rights crime. In a report by Oxfam America, slaughterhouse workers were observed not being allowed breaks, were often required to wear diapers, and were paid below minimum wage.

Possible alternatives

Cultured meat (aka "clean meat") potentially offers some advantages in terms of efficiency of resource use and animal welfare. It is, however, still at an early stage of development and its advantages are still contested.

Increasing health care costs for an aging baby boom population suffering from obesity and other food-related diseases, concerns about obesity in children have spurred new ideas about healthy nutrition with less emphasis on meat.

Native wild species like deer and bison in North America would be cheaper and potentially have less impact on the environment. The combination of more wild game meat options and higher costs for natural capital affected by the meat industry could be a building block towards a more sustainable livestock agriculture.

Alternative meat industry

A growing trend towards vegetarian or vegan diets and the Slow Food movement are indicators of a changing consumer conscience in western countries. Producers on the other hand have reacted to consumer concerns by slowly shifting towards ecological or organic farming. The Alternative meat industry is projected to be worth 140 billion in the next 10 years.

See also

 Agricultural robot
 Dairy industry in the United States
 Dairy industry in the United Kingdom
 List of largest meat companies in Germany
 Golden Triangle of Meat-packing
 Grinder-mixer
 ICT in agriculture
 Agricultural engineering
 Slaughterhouse
 World Beef Report
 Poultry industry
 Red meat
 Meat market
 Rendering (animal products)
 North American Meat Institute (NAMI)
 Meat Industry Workers Federation
 Pink slime, white slime
 Dairy industry
 Leather

References

Further reading
 Fuquay, John W. ed. Encyclopedia of Dairy Sciences (2nd Edition, 4 vol 2011), comprehensive coverage
 
 
 

 
Industries (economics)